Jules François Louis de Rohan (16 January 1697 – 6 May 1724) was a French nobleman and Prince of Soubise. He died of smallpox aged twenty-seven.

Biography

Born in Paris to Hercule Mériadec de Rohan and his wife Anne Geneviève de Lévis, as a member of the House of Rohan, he was entitled to the style of Highness. His mother was the only child of Madame de Ventadour.

At the age of seventeen, he married Anne Julie de Melun. The couple were wed in Paris on 16 September 1714. His wife was a daughter of Louis de Melun and Élisabeth Thérèse de Lorraine, herself a great granddaughter of Henry IV of France and were the parents of five children.

In May 1724, he and his wife caught smallpox. Jules was first to succumb to the illness and was followed by his wife on 18 May.

Issue

Charles de Rohan, Prince of Soubise, Duke of Rohan-Rohan (16 July 1715 – 4 July 1787) married Anne Marie Louise de La Tour d'Auvergne (1722–1739) and had issue; married again to Princess Anna Teresa of Savoy (1717–1745) and had issue; married Landgravine Anna Viktoria of Hesse-Rotenburg (1728–1792) no issue;
François Armand Auguste de Rohan, cardinal de Soubise, Prince of Tournon (1 December 1717–28 June 1758)
Marie Louise de Rohan (7 January 1720 – 4 March 1803) married Gaston Jean Baptiste de Lorraine, Count of Marsan, no issue; brother of Mademoiselle de Marsan.
François Auguste de Rohan, Count of Tournon (16 September 1721 – 6 August 1736) never married;
René de Rohan, Abbot of Luxeuil (26 July 1723 – 7 February 1743) never married.

Ancestry

References and notes

House of Rohan
18th-century French people
17th-century French people
People of the Regency of Philippe d'Orléans
People of the Ancien Régime
1697 births
1724 deaths
Deaths from smallpox
Nobility from Paris
Princes of Soubise
Dukes of Rohan-Rohan